Intermittent control is a feedback control method which not only explains some human control systems but also has applications to control engineering.

In the context of control theory, intermittent control provides a spectrum of possibilities between the two extremes of continuous-time and discrete-time control: the control signal consists of a sequence of (continuous-time) parameterised trajectories whose parameters are adjusted intermittently. It is different from discrete-time control in that the control is not constant between samples; it is different from continuous-time control in that the trajectories are reset intermittently. As a class of control theory, intermittent predictive control is more general than continuous control and provides a new paradigm incorporating continuous predictive and optimal control with intermittent, open loop (ballistic) control.

There are at least three areas where intermittent control is relevant. Firstly, continuous-time model-based predictive control where the intermittency is associated with on-line optimisation. Secondly, event-driven control systems where the intersample interval is time varying and determined by the event times. Thirdly, explanation of physiological control systems which, in some cases, have an intermittent character. This intermittency may be due to the “computation” in the central nervous system.

Conventional sampled-data control uses a zero-order hold, which produces a piecewise-constant control signal and can be used to give a
sampled-data implementation which approximates previously-designed continuous-time controller. In contrast to conventional sampled data control, intermittent control explicitly embeds the underlying continuous-time closed-loop system in a system-matched hold which generates an open-loop intersample control trajectory based on the underlying continuous-time closed-loop control system.

History 

Intermittent control initially evolved separately in the engineering and physiological literature.

Physiological literature 

The concept of intermittent control appeared in a posthumous paper by Kenneth Craik which states “The human operator behaves basically as an intermittent correction servo”. A colleague of Kenneth Craik, Margaret Vince, related the concept of intermittency to the Psychological refractory period and provided experimental verification of intermittency. Fernando Navas and James Stark showed experimentally that human hand movements were synchronised to input signals rather than to an internal clock: in other words the hand control system is event-driven not clock-driven. The first detailed mathematical model of intermittency was presented by Peter Neilson, Megan Neilson, and Nicholas O’Dwyer.
A more recent mathematical model of intermittency is given by PeterGawthrop, Ian Loram, Martin Lakie and Henrik Gollee.

Engineering literature 

In the context of Control Engineering, the term intermittent control was used by Eric Ronco, Taner Arsan and Peter Gawthrop.
 
They stated that “A conceptual, and practical difficulty with the continuous-time generalised predictive controller is solved by replacing the continuously moving horizon by an intermittently moving horizon. This allows slow optimisation to occur concurrently with a fast control action.”  The concept of intermittent model predictive control was refined by Peter Gawthrop working with Liuping Wang, who also looked at event-driven intermittent control.

In a separate line of development Tomas Estrada, Hai Lin and Panos Antsaklis developed the concept of model-based control with intermittent feedback in the context of a networked control system.

References 

Control theory